Pelobacter propionicus is a species of bacteria that ferments 2,3-butanediol and acetoin. It is Gram-negative, strictly anaerobic and non-spore-forming. Ott Bd 1 is the type strain.

References

Further reading

External links

LPSN
Type strain of Pelobacter propionicus at BacDive -  the Bacterial Diversity Metadatabase

Pelobacteraceae
Bacteria described in 1984